The Plainview-Old Bethpage Central School District (POBCSD) is the public school district which serves the Nassau County, Long Island communities of Plainview and Old Bethpage, as well as small parts of Farmingdale.

Schools
Plainview-Old Bethpage Central School District operates seven schools in seven buildings. POBCSD has one high school, two middle schools and four elementary schools.

POB Central School District Elementary Schools (Grades K–4)

Old Bethpage Elementary School
1191 Round Swamp Road
Old Bethpage, NY
Principal: Mrs. Suzanne Gray
Assistant Principal: Mrs. Kristin Seidel

Judy Jacobs-Parkway Elementary School
300 Manetto Hill Road
Plainview, NY
Principal: Mr. Greg Scesney
Assistant Principal: Mrs. Joanna Clampitt

Pasadena Elementary School
3 Richard Court
Plainview, NY
Principal: Ms. Karen Heitner
Assistant Principal: Ms. Jodi Marchese

Stratford Road Elementary School
33 Bedford Road
Plainview, NY
Principal: Christina Psihogios 
Assistant Principal: Mrs. Lynn Winters

POB Central School District Secondary Schools (Grades 5–12)

Howard B. Mattlin Middle School 
100 Washington Avenue
Plainview, NY
Principal: Dr. Joseph Coladonato
Assistant Principals: Dr. Regina Buck, Ms. Christine Krowles.

Plainview-Old Bethpage Middle School 
121 Central Park Road
Plainview, NY
Principal: Mrs. Kerry Farrell
Assistant Principals: Ms. Dorothy Drexel

Plainview-Old Bethpage John F. Kennedy High School

50 Kennedy Drive
Plainview, NY
Grades: 9–12
Principal: Mr. James Murray
Assistant Principals:  Mrs. Diana Beltrani, Mr. Michael Cestaro, Mr. Philip Farrelly, Dr. Matina Stergiopoulos, Dr. Thomas Schwartz

Administration

 Superintendent of Schools 
Dr. Mary T. O’Meara

Assistant Superintendent for Curriculum & Instruction
Mrs. Joanne F. Mannion

Assistant Superintendent for Student Services and Safety
Mr. Christopher T. Donarummo

Assistant Superintendent for Business
Mr. Richard J. Cunningham

Assistant Superintendent for Human Resources
Dr. Vincent K. Mulieri

Director of Technology
Dr. Guy A. Lodico

Director of Pupil Personnel Services
Mrs. Dolores Espinosa

Director of Guidance
Ms. Laurie B. Lynn

Director of Physical Education, Recreation and Athletics/Health
Mr. Joseph Braico

Director of Art and Digital Instruction 
Mr. Ben Wiley

Director of Music
Interim

Assistant Director of Special Ed Instruction
Ms. Jennifer Lott - Grades K–4
Ms. Meredythe Alliegro - Grades 5–8
Ms. Sandra Parmenti - Grades 9–12

Director of School Facilities & Operations
Mr. Andrew Ward

Board of education
The Plainview-Old Bethpage Board of Education establishes policies and adopts regulations for the operation of the district's seven public schools. Its seven members serve without pay and are elected by the qualified voters of the district for a term of three years. Responsibility for administering Board policies is vested in the Superintendent.

President: Ms. Debbie Bernstein

Vice President: Mr. Seth Greenberg

Trustees: Ms. Lauren Sackstein, Ms. Ginger Lieberman, Mr. Jared Goerke, Mr. Gary Bettan, Ms. Tara Rock
 

District Clerk:  Jeanne Tyler

District Attorney : Guercio and Guercio

History
The first school in the community was built by Quaker settlers in 1786 adjacent to their meetinghouse on Quaker Meeting House Road in Farmingdale. In 1825, after the State Legislature established local school districts, Plainview (then-Manetto Hill) got its first school. During this time, Plainview and Old Bethpage had separate school districts. The building was replaced by a one-room schoolhouse built in 1899 that still stands today next to, and currently owned by the Mid-Island Y-JCC. Although there was only one room, there were two classrooms split by a folding wall; each teacher taught three grades. One teacher taught grades one through three, and one taught grades one through six. Children in grades seven through twelve were sent to nearby schools in Farmingdale and Hicksville. Meanwhile, in Old Bethpage, the first public school building was built in 1825 just north of the current elementary school. It was replaced by the one-room "little red schoolhouse" on Round Swamp and Schoolhouse Roads in 1850. This building was replaced by a two-room schoolhouse in 1916, offering classes from first to sixth grade. Seventh through twelfth graders went to nearby Farmingdale. In 1947, the student population in the building dropped to a mere seven, so the board of trustees of the district closed it down and sent students to Farmingdale. This building was rented in the early 1950s by Plainview's school district and later used as an annex before being sold and demolished to home developers in 1974.

In 1954, Old Bethpage was hit with a sudden population boom thanks to housing development Eileen Gardens. The student population tremendously grew from 25 to well over 100. The same year, Farmingdale said it could not handle the student population anymore, so students then went to Bethpage. In May 1956, Bethpage also had to close out students, except for high school students, because of a similar growth rate. The year before, thankfully, residents of Old Bethpage voted to build a new grade school with a capacity of 660 students. The building opened in 1956 and is still in operation today as Old Bethpage Elementary School. Plainview was also experiencing similar issues in 1949, when the first housing development in the area would add over 1,000 new residents. Even though a need for a new school was clear, taxpayers didn't want to pay for it. There were proposals of merging with Hicksville schools, but that was shot down by the voters. In 1951, residents finally approved construction of the five-room Manetto Hill Grade School.

In the 1950s, Plainview's schools were filling up very quickly. They had only two classrooms in the original Manetto Hill School, five more in the new one, four in a rented Melville school, and two in the Little Red Schoolhouse. Kindergarten was on triple session, elementary on double, and eighth graders had to go to Syosset. High schoolers either went to Hicksville or Oyster Bay. In 1953, some classrooms had up to 41 students, and the new Manetto Hill School got an addition in 1956 to meet demands. In 1954, Jamaica Avenue School opened, and in 1957 an addition was added, boosting the capacity to over 1,000 students.  It served all grades up until 1960, and was used for administration until 1993. In 1955, Central Park Road School opened to further meet student demands and yet another addition was added in 1956 to bring capacity to 660. The last three of the new but now-shuttered schools were Fern Place School, which opened and closed in 1955 and 1974, respectively; and Joyce Road school, which opened and closed in 1957 and 1978, respectively; and Oak Drive Elementary School, which opened and closed on 1957 and 1976, respectively. For the 1957 school year, and to this day, Plainview's and Old Bethpage's school districts combined into what is officially Central School District #4. That same year, residents approved of a new $4.89 million school that opened in 1960. It opened as Plainview-Old Bethpage High School, but was converted into Plainview-Old Bethpage Middle School in 1991, the same year the high schools merged into one.

In 1959, two new Plainview schools opened, and all are still open today-Parkway Elementary School (now named Judy Jacobs-Parkway Elementary School for deceased county legislature Judy Jacobs), and Pasadena Elementary School. Pasadena was closed in 1981 due to low population, but reopened in 2000. In 1960, what was then called Plainview Junior High School opened, costing a whopping $3.4 million, and was later changed to Stratford Road Elementary in 1992. In 1961, the Board of Education approved of Howard B. Mattlin Middle School, in honor of former board member Mattlin, who died at age 36 due to cancer.

At the end of the population boom, voters in 1963 approved to build John F. Kennedy High School (now Plainview-Old Bethpage John F. Kennedy High School). The 53-acre site that also includes parts of Mattlin Middle School and Kennedy Drive opened in 1966. The two high schools were merged in 1991 into the Plainview-Old Bethpage John F. Kennedy High School. This new school kept John F. Kennedy High School's colors of blue and white and adapted the mascot of the Hawks to replace its abandoned Eagle mascot and Plainview-Old Bethpage High School's green and yellow Gulls. At one point, the two middle schools had been junior high schools, going up to the 9th grade, but in 1978 the 9th grade was moved to the high schools.

In 1996, the district opened its Kindergarten Center. All Kindergarten students attended school here until its closure in 2016. Kindergarten classes were moved into the four elementary schools, citing both decrease in student population and the fact that students were separated from each other at the beginning of first grade until high school.

Closed Schools 
 Plainview-Old Bethpage Kindergarten Center (Closed in 2016), now merged with Stratford Road Elementary
 Central Park Road School (demolished) the current site of the Residence Inn Marriott, Plainview.
 Fern Place School (now the Association for Children with Down Syndrome)
 Jamaica Avenue School (now houses Miss Debbie's Creative Childcare, a private child care center, and another daycare, and hosts senior citizens' activities.) 
 Joyce Road School (now the Hebrew Academy of Nassau County) 
 The Little Red School House (demolished) 
 Manetto Hill Road School (1899) (now the offices of the Mid-Island Y JCC of Plainview) 
 Manetto Hill Road School (1971) (now the main building of the Mid-Island Y JCC of Plainview)
 Oak Drive School (demolished)

Neighboring Districts
Residents of certain parts of Plainview, NY, are served by the Syosset Central School District and the Bethpage Union Free School District.

Bibliography

 "Images of America: Plainview-Old Bethpage", by Thomas Carr, published in 2017

References

External links

Plainview-Old Bethpage Congress of Teachers
Plainview-Old Bethpage Library

School districts in New York (state)
Education in Nassau County, New York
Plainview, New York
Old Bethpage, New York